The following outline is provided as an overview of and topical guide to the United Arab Emirates:

The United Arab Emirates (UAE) is a sovereign federation of seven states located southeast of the Persian Gulf on the Arabian Peninsula in Southwest Asia, bordering Oman and Saudi Arabia.  The seven states, termed emirates, are Abu Dhabi, Ajman, Dubai, Fujairah, Ras al-Khaimah, Sharjah, and Umm al-Quwain.

The UAE, rich in oil and natural gas, has become highly prosperous after gaining foreign direct investment funding in the 1970s. The country has a relatively high Human Development Index for the Asian continent and ranked 39th globally.

Before 1971, the UAE were known as the Trucial States or Trucial Oman, in reference to a nineteenth-century truce between Britain and several Arab Sheikhs. The name Pirate Coast was also used in reference to the area's emirates in the eighteenth to early twentieth century.

General reference

 Common English country name: The United Arab Emirates
 Official English country name: The United Arab Emirates
 Historic endonym: Maganite (ancient); Trucial Coaster (medieval)
 Common endonym(s):  
 Official endonym(s):  
 Adjectival(s): Emirati, Emirian
 Demonym(s):
 Etymology: Name of the United Arab Emirates
 International rankings of the United Arab Emirates
 ISO country codes:  AE, ARE, 784
 ISO region codes:  See ISO 3166-2:AE
 Internet country code top-level domain:  .ae

Geography of the United Arab Emirates

Geography of the United Arab Emirates
 The United Arab Emirates is: a country
 Location:
 Northern Hemisphere and Eastern Hemisphere
 Eurasia
 Asia
 Southwest Asia
 Middle East
 Arabian Peninsula
 Time zone:  UTC+04
 Extreme points of the United Arab Emirates
 High:  Unnamed knoll west of Jabal Bil Ays 
 Low:  Persian Gulf and Gulf of Oman 0 m
 Land boundaries:  867 km
 457 km
 410 km
 Coastline:  1,318 km
 Population of the United Arab Emirates: 
 Area of the United Arab Emirates: 
 Atlas of the United Arab Emirates

Environment of the United Arab Emirates

 Climate of the United Arab Emirates
 Renewable energy in the United Arab Emirates
 Geology of the United Arab Emirates
 Protected areas of the United Arab Emirates
 Biosphere reserves in the United Arab Emirates
 National parks of the United Arab Emirates
 Wildlife of the United Arab Emirates
 Fauna of the United Arab Emirates
 Birds of the United Arab Emirates
 Mammals of the United Arab Emirates

Natural geographic features of the United Arab Emirates
 Glaciers of the United Arab Emirates
 Islands of the United Arab Emirates
 Lakes of the United Arab Emirates
 Mountains of the United Arab Emirates
 Volcanoes in the United Arab Emirates
 Rivers of the United Arab Emirates
 Waterfalls of the United Arab Emirates
 Valleys of the United Arab Emirates
 World Heritage Sites in the United Arab Emirates: None

Regions of the United Arab Emirates 

Regions of the United Arab Emirates

Ecoregions of the United Arab Emirates 

List of ecoregions in the United Arab Emirates
 Ecoregions in the United Arab Emirates

Administrative divisions of the United Arab Emirates 

Emirates of the United Arab Emirates
Abu Dhabi
Ajman: 1 exclave
Dubai: 1 exclave
Fujairah: 2 exclaves
Ras al-Khaimah: 1 exclave
Sharjah: 3 exclaves
Umm al-Quwain

Demography of the United Arab Emirates

Demographics of the United Arab Emirates

Government and politics of the United Arab Emirates

Politics of the United Arab Emirates
 Form of government: federal presidential elected monarchy
 Capital of the United Arab Emirates: Abu Dhabi
 Elections in the United Arab Emirates
 Political parties in the United Arab Emirates
 Taxation in the United Arab Emirates

Branches of the government of the United Arab Emirates

Government of the United Arab Emirates

Executive branch of the government of the United Arab Emirates
 Head of state: President of the United Arab Emirates
 Head of government: Prime Minister of the United Arab Emirates
 Cabinet of the United Arab Emirates

Legislative branch of the government of the United Arab Emirates
 Parliament of the United Arab Emirates (bicameral)
 Upper house: Senate of the United Arab Emirates
 Lower house: House of Commons of the United Arab Emirates

Judicial branch of the government of the United Arab Emirates

Court system of the United Arab Emirates
 Supreme Court of the United Arab Emirates

Foreign relations of the United Arab Emirates

Foreign relations of the United Arab Emirates
 Diplomatic missions in the United Arab Emirates
 Diplomatic missions of the United Arab Emirates

International organization membership
The United Arab Emirates is a member of:

Arab Bank for Economic Development in Africa (ABEDA)
Arab Fund for Economic and Social Development (AFESD)
Arab Monetary Fund (AMF)
Cooperation Council for the Arab States of the Gulf (GCC)
Food and Agriculture Organization (FAO)
Group of 77 (G77)
International Atomic Energy Agency (IAEA)
International Bank for Reconstruction and Development (IBRD)
International Chamber of Commerce (ICC)
International Civil Aviation Organization (ICAO)
International Criminal Court (ICCt) (signatory)
International Criminal Police Organization (Interpol)
International Development Association (IDA)
International Federation of Red Cross and Red Crescent Societies (IFRCS)
International Finance Corporation (IFC)
International Fund for Agricultural Development (IFAD)
International Hydrographic Organization (IHO)
International Labour Organization (ILO)
International Maritime Organization (IMO)
International Mobile Satellite Organization (IMSO)
International Monetary Fund (IMF)
International Olympic Committee (IOC)
International Organization for Standardization (ISO)

International Red Cross and Red Crescent Movement (ICRM)
International Telecommunication Union (ITU)
International Telecommunications Satellite Organization (ITSO)
Inter-Parliamentary Union (IPU)
Islamic Development Bank (IDB)
League of Arab States (LAS)
Multilateral Investment Guarantee Agency (MIGA)
Nonaligned Movement (NAM)
Organisation of Islamic Cooperation (OIC)
Organisation for the Prohibition of Chemical Weapons (OPCW)
Organization of Arab Petroleum Exporting Countries (OAPEC)
Organization of Petroleum Exporting Countries (OPEC)
United Nations (UN)
United Nations Conference on Trade and Development (UNCTAD)
United Nations Educational, Scientific, and Cultural Organization (UNESCO)
United Nations Industrial Development Organization (UNIDO)
Universal Postal Union (UPU)
World Customs Organization (WCO)
World Federation of Trade Unions (WFTU)
World Health Organization (WHO)
World Intellectual Property Organization (WIPO)
World Meteorological Organization (WMO)
World Trade Organization (WTO)

Law and order in the United Arab Emirates

Law of the United Arab Emirates
 Constitution of the United Arab Emirates
 Crime in the United Arab Emirates
 Human rights in the United Arab Emirates
 LGBT rights in the United Arab Emirates
 Freedom of religion in the United Arab Emirates
 Law enforcement in the United Arab Emirates

Military of the United Arab Emirates

Military of the United Arab Emirates
 Command
 Commander-in-chief:
 Ministry of Defence of the United Arab Emirates
 Forces
 Army of the United Arab Emirates
 Navy of the United Arab Emirates
 Air Force of the United Arab Emirates
 Special forces of the United Arab Emirates
 Military history of the United Arab Emirates
 Military ranks of the United Arab Emirates

Local government in the United Arab Emirates

Local government in the United Arab Emirates

History of the United Arab Emirates

History of the United Arab Emirates

Other articles:
 Timeline of the history of the United Arab Emirates
 Current events of the United Arab Emirates
 Military history of the United Arab Emirates
 National Center for Documentation and Research

Culture of the United Arab Emirates

Culture of the United Arab Emirates
 Architecture of the United Arab Emirates
 Cuisine of the United Arab Emirates
 Festivals in the United Arab Emirates
 Languages of the United Arab Emirates
 Media in the United Arab Emirates
 Museums in the United Arab Emirates
 Music of the United Arab Emirates
 National symbols of the United Arab Emirates
 Emblem of the United Arab Emirates
 Flag of the United Arab Emirates
 National anthem of the United Arab Emirates
 People of the United Arab Emirates
 Prostitution in the United Arab Emirates
 Public holidays in the United Arab Emirates
 Records of the United Arab Emirates
 Religion in the United Arab Emirates
 Buddhism in the United Arab Emirates
 Christianity in the United Arab Emirates
 Hinduism in the United Arab Emirates
 Islam in the United Arab Emirates
 Judaism in the United Arab Emirates
 Sikhism in the United Arab Emirates
 World Heritage Sites in the United Arab Emirates: None

Art in the United Arab Emirates
 Art in the United Arab Emirates
 Cinema of the United Arab Emirates
 Literature of the United Arab Emirates
 Music of the United Arab Emirates
 Television in the United Arab Emirates
 Theatre in the United Arab Emirates

Sport in the United Arab Emirates

Sport in the United Arab Emirates
 Football in the United Arab Emirates

Economy and infrastructure of the United Arab Emirates

Economy of the United Arab Emirates
 Economic rank, by nominal GDP (2007): 37th (thirty-seventh)
 Agriculture in the United Arab Emirates
 Banking in the United Arab Emirates
 National Bank of the United Arab Emirates
 Communications in the United Arab Emirates
 Internet in the United Arab Emirates
 Companies of the United Arab Emirates
Currency of the United Arab Emirates: Dirham
ISO 4217: AED
 Energy in the United Arab Emirates
 Energy policy of the United Arab Emirates
 Nuclear power in the United Arab Emirates
 Oil industry in the United Arab Emirates
 Health care in the United Arab Emirates
 Mining in the United Arab Emirates
 United Arab Emirates Stock Exchange
 Tourism in the United Arab Emirates
 Transport in the United Arab Emirates
 Airports in the United Arab Emirates
 Rail transport in the United Arab Emirates
 Roads in the United Arab Emirates
 Water supply and sanitation in the United Arab Emirates

Education in the United Arab Emirates

Education in the United Arab Emirates

See also

United Arab Emirates
Index of United Arab Emirates-related articles
List of international rankings
List of United Arab Emirates-related topics
Member state of the United Nations
Outline of Asia
Outline of geography

References

External links

 Government of United Arab Emirates
 
 
 
 World Intellectual Property Handbook: United Arab Emirates
 Mostovski, M.B. & Brothers, D.J. 2008. Arthropod Fauna of the UAE, Volume 1, Antonius van Harten (editor). African Invertebrates 49 (1): 159–160.
Mafiwasta – An Organisation for Workers' Rights in the UAE

United Arab Emirates
 Outline
 Outline